HomeBase was a home improvement warehouse chain in the Western United States based in Irvine, California.

History
Robert J. McNulty and George Handgis founded the chain as a warehouse club called the HomeClub, opening the first two stores in Norwalk and Fountain Valley, California, in 1983. It went public in 1985, trading on the New York Stock Exchange under the symbol HBI.

In 1985, it was acquired by Zayre, a Framingham, Massachusetts-based discount department store chain. After Zayre was acquired by Ames, HomeClub was spun off under a new company called Waban Inc., which also owned BJ's Wholesale Club. In 1991, it discontinued its membership program and adopted the HomeBase name shortly thereafter.

The chain expanded to 89 stores by the mid-1990s, becoming the sixth largest home improvement retailer in the United States. Although it outperformed competitors like Orchard Supply Hardware and Builders Square, it could not match the growth or pricing power of The Home Depot or Lowe's. On December 5, 2000, after several dramatically unprofitable years, it announced that 67 stores would be converted to a home decorating superstore chain, House2Home, and the remainder closed. House2Home would fare no better and filed for Chapter 11 bankruptcy on November 7, 2001, and was subsequently liquidated in early 2002.

References
 "Hardware wars heating up in Los Angeles, Orange Counties," Los Angeles Business Journal, August 2, 1999
 Canlen, Brae, "HomeBase seeks new shelter from competitive storm," Home Channel News, January 8, 2001.

Defunct retail companies of the United States
Retail companies established in 1983
Retail companies disestablished in 2002
Companies that filed for Chapter 11 bankruptcy in 1988
Companies that filed for Chapter 11 bankruptcy in 1990
Companies that filed for Chapter 11 bankruptcy in 2001
Defunct companies based in California
Home improvement retailers of the United States